The Australian Sports Anti-Doping Authority (ASADA) was a government statutory authority tasked to protect Australia's sporting integrity through the elimination of doping.  The authority was part of the Department of Health's portfolio and was established on 13 March 2006 under the Australian Sports Anti‑Doping Authority Act 2006. On 1 July 2020, it became part of Sport Integrity Australia.

The ASADA drug tested Australian athletes who competed at state and national levels. ASADA also tested international athletes if they were competing in events held in Australia. It was also ASADA's role to inform the sporting community of drugs and related safety issues. The ASADA Advisory Group was relied upon by the Chief Executive Officer, David Sharpe, as a consultative forum on matters related to the agency's purpose.

Officeholders

Chair
The following individuals have served as Chair of the Authority:

Chief Executive Officer 
The following individuals have served as Chief Executive Officer of the Authority. When ASADA replaced the Australian Sports Drug Agency in 2006, the Chair and Chief Executive positions were combined.

See also

Drugs in sport in Australia
Sports in Australia

References

External links

Anti-doping organizations
Sports governing bodies in Australia
Drugs in sport in Australia
2006 establishments in Australia
Government agencies established in 2006
2020 disestablishments in Australia
Government agencies disestablished in 2020